Sharneyford is a hamlet in Lancashire, England, on the A681 road between Bacup and Todmorden. It is home to one of the smallest schools in Britain, Sharneyford Primary School. Further up the hill there was a chapel, which was replaced by church further down the hill; the chapel became an engine-house for the railway that provided transport to and from the mill, when the mill was destroyed, the engine-house was emptied and abandoned.

References

External links

Hamlets in Lancashire
Geography of the Borough of Rossendale